... So Good Afternoon is the second studio album by American alternative rock band Caroline's Spine. The relatively short album features many tracks which would be later re-recorded for other albums. It was intended primarily as a compilation to sell at their live shows.

Track listing

Personnel
 Jimmy Newquist – vocals, bass, guitar
 Jason Gilardi – drums, percussion
 Mark Haugh – guitar
 Luis Moral – bass (Listed, but did not record.  He joined briefly after the recording.)

Production
 Produced by Dan Calderone and Caroline's Spine
 All music and lyrics by James P. Newqust
 Music published by Archaic Music (BMI)
 Recorded & mixed at Anza Digital, San Diego, CA in July 1994.
 Engineered by Dan Calderone & Joe Statt
 Layout & design by Joe Statt
 Photography by Jim Newquist, Elizabeth Capps, Jeff Taylor, Mark Haugh & Lori Statt

References

1994 albums
Caroline's Spine albums